Renato de Moraes (born August 16, 1980) is a retired Brazilian midfielder.

References

External links
 Player profile - PrvaLiga
 Player profile - FFA
 

1980 births
Living people
Brazilian footballers
Brazilian expatriate footballers
FC Ararat Yerevan players
NK Rudar Velenje players
Ulisses FC players
Expatriate footballers in Armenia
Expatriate footballers in Slovenia
Footballers from São Paulo
Armenian Premier League players
Association football midfielders